Joseph Robert Chan (born 17 June 1946) is a Papua New Guinean former sports shooter. He competed in the men's 50 metre rifle, prone event at the 1984 Summer Olympics.

References

External links
 

1946 births
Living people
Papua New Guinean male sport shooters
Olympic shooters of Papua New Guinea
Shooters at the 1984 Summer Olympics
Place of birth missing (living people)